Mangrovibacter is a genus in the phylum Pseudomonadota (Bacteria). The name Mangrovibacter derives from:New Latin noun mangrovum, mangrove; New Latin masculine gender noun, a rod; bacter, nominally meaning "a rod", but in effect meaning a bacterium, rod; New Latin masculine gender noun Mangrovibacter, mangrove rod.

Species
The genus contains a single species, namely M. plantisponsor ( Rameshkumar et al. 2010, (Type species of the genus).; Latin feminine gender noun planta, plant; Latin masculine gender noun sponsor, sponsor, guarantor; New Latin masculine gender noun plantisponsor, sponsor of plants, referring to the potentially plant-beneficial properties of the type strain.)

See also
 Bacterial taxonomy 
 Microbiology

References 

Enterobacteriaceae